John "Jack" Moore (birth unknown – death unknown) was an English professional rugby league footballer who played in the 1930s and 1940s.

International honours
Jack Moore won a cap for England while at Bradford Northern in 1940 against Wales on Saturday 9 November at The Watersheddings (Oldham) the score was  Wales 5 V England 8.

Outside of Rugby League
Jack Moore was one of two Bradford Northern players to lose their lives in the World War II, the other being Charles Freeman, Moore was killed in action on Friday 27 February 1942 when his ship, HMS Electra, was sunk in the Battle of the Java Sea. His name is recorded on Panel 65, Column 3 at the Portsmouth Naval Memorial.

References

External links

1942 deaths
Bradford Bulls players
Royal Navy personnel killed in World War II
England national rugby league team players
English rugby league players
Place of birth missing
Place of death missing
Rugby league locks
Rugby league players from Kingston upon Hull
Year of birth missing
Royal Navy sailors